The 1943–44 season was Stoke City's ninth season in the non-competitive War League.

In 1939 World War II was declared and the Football League was cancelled. In its place were formed War Leagues and cups, based on geographical lines rather than based on previous league placement. However, none of these were considered to be competitive football, and thus their records are not recognised by the Football League and thus not included in official records.

Season review
With the war now at its most demanding clubs had to rely on even more guest players and Stoke used the most players this season more than any other time during the war. With most senior players being called for military duty there was a largely youthful feel to Stoke squad for the 1943–44 season and it showed as they ended the first phase of the Football League North in an overall position of 34th (out of 50 teams) and in the second phase they finished in 13th. Freddie Steele hit an impressive 20 goals from just 9 matches including a double hat trick against Wolverhampton Wanderers.

Results

Stoke's score comes first

Legend

Football League North 1st Phase

Football League North 2nd Phase

Football League War Cup

Midland Cup

Squad statistics

References

Stoke City F.C. seasons
Stoke City